Transport infrastructure in Brazil is characterized by strong regional differences and lack of development of the national rail network. Brazil's fast-growing economy, and especially the growth in exports, will place increasing demands on the transport networks. However, sizeable new investments that are expected to address some of the issues are either planned or in progress. It is common to travel domestically by air because the price is low. Brazil has the second highest number of airports in the world, after the USA.

Railways

It is basically used for transporting ores. Usually, the railway sector was treated in a secondary way in Brazil, due to logistical, economic or political difficulties to install more railways.

The Brazilian railroad system had a great expansion between 1875 and 1920. The heyday of the railway modal was interrupted during the Getúlio Vargas government, which prioritized the road modal. In the 1940s, the railway network was already facing several problems, from low-powered locomotives to uneconomical layouts. In 1957, a state-owned company was created, the National Railroad Network (RFFSA), which started to manage 18 railroads in the Union. Several deficit railways were closed under the promise of state investment in new projects, which did not happen. The actions were centralized in the government until the opening of the market in 1990. So, the National Privatization Plan was instituted, with dozens of concessions being made. However, they ended up concentrating the railways, mainly, in three large business groups, América Latina Logística (ALL), Vale S.A. and MRS Logística. The refurbishment generated an increase in productivity (cargoes transported increased by 30% with the same railway line). However, the main problem was that the reform not only gave away the railway line, but also geographical exclusivity. This resulted in the non-creation of competitive incentives for the expansion and renewal of the existing network. With the State maintaining the opening of new railways a difficult, slow and bureaucratic process, as it maintains the total monopoly of power over this sector, the railways did not expand any further in the country, and the sector was very outdated.

In 2021, a New Framework for Railways was created, allowing the construction of railways by authorization, as occurs in the exploration of infrastructure in sectors such as telecommunications, electricity and ports. It's also possible to authorize the exploration of stretches not implemented, idle, or in the process of being returned or deactivated. With the change of rules in the sector, in December 2021, there were already requests to open  of new tracks, in 64 requests for implementation of new railways.

Total actual network: 29,888 km of railroad and 1,411 km of subway and light rail
Broad gauge: 4,932 km  gauge (939 km electrified)
Narrow gauge: 23,341 km  gauge (24 km electrified)
Dual gauge: 396 km 1000 mm and 1600 mm gauges (three rails)
Standard gauge: 194 km  gauge (2014)

 Estrada de Ferro do Amapá in the middle of the Amazon Rainforest also used standard gauge.
 A 12 km section of the former  gauge Estrada de Ferro Oeste de Minas is retained as a heritage railway.

Metros and light rail transit (combined)

Railway links with adjacent countries

International rail links exist between Brazil and Argentina, Bolivia and Uruguay.

Tramways
Brazil had a hundred tramway systems. Currently, there are vintage tramways operating in Belém, Campinas, Campos do Jordão, Itatinga, Rio de Janeiro and Santos.

Highways 

The total of paved roads increased from 35,496 km (22,056 mi) in 1967 to 215,000 km (133,595 mi) in 2018. The two most important highways in the country are BR-101 and BR-116.

The main road axes also have problems because they often have inadequate geometry and constructive characteristics that don't allow quality long-distance flow (non-interference from local traffic and high speed). The Brazilian Federal Government has never implemented a National Highway Plan at the same level as developed countries such as the USA, Japan or European countries, which specifically aimed at inter-regional travel, and which should preferably be served by highways (which would differ from the common duplicated highways by geometric pattern, access control without access to neighboring lots, zero level crossings and returns, prohibition of circulation of non-motorized vehicles such as cyclists, animal traction or human propulsion, as per the Vienna Convention). The Brazilian State, despite some planning efforts, has been guided by a reactive action to the increase in demand (only duplicating some roads with old and inadequate layout) and not by a purposeful vision, directing occupation and economic density in the territory. Another problem is the lack of directing the Union Budget towards infrastructure works: in Brazil there is no law that guarantees funds from the Federal Budget for works on highways and other modes of transport (unlike what happens in sectors such as Education and Health), depending exclusively on the goodwill of the rulers. In the US, for example, the gasoline tax can only be used for transport infrastructure works. Brazil even invested 1.5% of the country's budget in infrastructure in the 1970s, being the time when the most investment was made in highways; but in the 1990s, only 0.1% of the budget was invested in this sector, maintaining an average of 0.5% in the 2000s and 2010, insufficient amounts for the construction of an adequate road network. For comparative purposes, the average investment of the USA and the European Union was 1% between 1995 and 2013, even though they already have a much more advanced road infrastructure than Brazil.

The country has a medium rate of car ownership of 471 per 1000 people, however in comparison to the other developing economies of the BRIC group Brazil exceeds India and China.

The country still has several states where paved access to 100% of the state's municipalities has not yet been reached. Some states have 100% of cities with asphalt access, such as Santa Catarina, which reached this goal in 2014; Paraíba, which reached this goal in 2017, and Alagoas, which reached this goal in 2021  In states like Rio Grande do Sul, in 2020, there were still 54 cities without asphalt access. In Paraná, in 2021, there were still 4 cities without asphalt access. In Minas Gerais, in 2016, there were still 5 cities without asphalt access.

Waterways

50,000 km navigable (most in areas remote from industry or population) (2012)

Among the main Brazilian waterways, two stand out: Hidrovia Tietê-Paraná (which has a length of 2,400 km, 1,600 on the Paraná River and 800 km on the Tietê River, draining agricultural production from the states of Mato Grosso, Mato Grosso do Sul, Goiás and part of Rondônia, Tocantins and Minas Gerais) and Hidrovia do Solimões-Amazonas (it has two sections: Solimões, which extends from Tabatinga to Manaus, with approximately 1600 km, and Amazonas, which extends from Manaus to Belém, with 1650 km. Almost entirely passenger transport from the Amazon plain is done by this waterway, in addition to practically all cargo transportation that is directed to the major regional centers of Belém and Manaus). In Brazil, this transport is still underutilized: the most important waterway stretches, from an economic point of view, are found in the Southeast and South of the country. Its full use still depends on the construction of locks, major dredging works and, mainly, of ports that allow intermodal integration.

Pipelines
 condensate/gas 62 km
 natural gas 11,696 km (1,165 km distribution, 4,794 km transport)
 liquid petroleum gas 353 km (37 km distribution, 40 km transport)
 crude oil 4,517 km (1,985 km distribution)
 refined products 5,959 km (1,165 km distribution, 4,794 km transport)

Seaports and harbors 

The busiest port in the country, and the 2nd busiest in all of Latin America, losing only to the Port of Colón, is the Port of Santos. Other high-movement ports are the Port of Rio de Janeiro, Port of Paranaguá, Port of Itajaí, Port of Rio Grande, Port of São Francisco do Sul and Suape Port.

Atlantic Ocean

Amazon river
 Belém
 Manaus
 Santarém

Paraguay River (international water way)
 Corumbá

Merchant marine
770 ships ( (or over) totaling /

ships by type: (1999, 2019 and 2021 est.)

Airports 

The country has the second largest number of airports in the world, behind only the United States. São Paulo/Guarulhos, is the largest and busiest in the country. Brazil has 37 international airports, such as those in Rio de Janeiro, Brasília, Belo Horizonte, Porto Alegre, Florianópolis, Cuiabá, Salvador, Recife, Fortaleza, Belém and Manaus, among others.

Most international flights must go to São Paulo–Guarulhos International Airport or Rio de Janeiro–Galeão International Airport. Belo Horizonte is the main international airport outside Rio de Janeiro and São Paulo. A few go to Brasília, Recife, Natal, and just recently Fortaleza has accepted international flights.

As of 2020, Brazil had the eighth largest passenger air market in the world.

Airports - with paved runways 
total: 698
over 3,047 m: 7
2,438 to 3,047 m: 27
1,524 to 2,437 m: 179
914 to 1,523 m: 436 (2017)
under 914 m: 39 (2017)

Airports - with unpaved runways 
total: 3,395
1,524 to 2,437 m: 92
914 to 1,523 m: 1,619
under 914 m: 1,684 (2013)

Main airlines 

Azul Brazilian Airlines
Gol Linhas Aéreas Inteligentes
LATAM Brasil
Voepass Linhas Aéreas

Heliports 
16 (2007)
13 (2010)
13 (2013)

See also 
 National Association of Cargo Transportation and Logistics (Brazil)
 Rail transport by country
 Plug-in electric vehicles in Brazil

References 
CIA - The World Factbook - Brazil - Transportation

External links

 Infrastructure Ministry of Brazil
 Brazilian National Aquatic Transport Agency (ANTAQ)
 Brazilian National Civil Aviation Agency (ANAC)
 Brazilian National Terrestrial Transportation Agency (ANTT)
 Brazilian National Transport Confederation (CNT)